Don Tosti (given name: Edmundo Martínez Tostado) (March 27, 1923 – August 2, 2004) was an American musician and composer. Tosti forged a career spanning several decades and styles, from classical to jazz and rhythm and blues. He was best remembered for his Pachuco-style compositions like the hit "Pachuco Boogie". Recorded in 1948, it was the first million-selling Latin song.

Career 
Tosti's career began in the Boyle Heights neighborhood of Los Angeles with other Mexican-American jazz musicians such as Ray Vasquez and Eddie Cano.

Tosti and his Mexican Jazzmen performed for the famed ninth Cavalcade of Jazz concert held at Wrigley Field in Los Angeles which was produced by Leon Hefflin, Sr. on June 7, 1953. Also featured that day were Roy Brown and his Orchestra, Shorty Rogers, Earl Bostic, Nat "King" Cole, and Louis Armstrong and his All Stars with Velma Middleton.

Personal life 
Tosti lived in the Deep Well neighborhood of Palm Springs, California, from 1973 until his death in 2004. In 1996, a Golden Palm Star on the Palm Springs Walk of Stars was dedicated to him.

Tosti was buried at the Hollywood Forever Cemetery in Hollywood, Los Angeles.

References

External links
 Guide to the Don Tosti Papers at the California Ethnic and Multicultural Archives

1923 births
2004 deaths
American male composers
American musicians of Mexican descent
Musicians from El Paso, Texas
Musicians from Palm Springs, California
Burials at Hollywood Forever Cemetery
20th-century American composers
Jazz musicians from California
Jazz musicians from Texas
20th-century American male musicians
American male jazz musicians